Abraham McClellan (November 1, 1776 – September 18, 1851) was a U.S. politician from Missouri.

Abraham McCllellan was born in Virginia. He later moved to Jackson County, Missouri, where he built one of the first houses in Fort Osage Township, Missouri, and became one of the county's most prominent citizens during the pioneer days. In 1827, he was appointed as a Jackson County Judge by Governor John Miller. He was appointed as State Treasurer of Missouri in 1838, succeeding John Walker, who had died in office, and served in that post until 1843.

References
 Missouri State Treasurer Scott Fitzpatrick-Past Treasurers-Abraham McClellan

1776 births
1851 deaths
State treasurers of Missouri
Missouri Democrats
Missouri state court judges
People from Jackson County, Missouri